Jai Jawan Jai Kisan Mazdoor Congress, a political party in India, launched on 10 December 2004 by former Bharatiya Janata Party general secretary Sunil Shastri son of Lal Bahadur Shastri.

References

Political parties established in 2004
2004 establishments in India
Agrarian parties in India
Bharatiya Janata Party breakaway groups